is one of 24 wards of Osaka, Japan. It is located in the north of the city.

Economy
Nissin Foods has its corporate headquarters in Yodogawa-ku. The company moved to its current headquarters in 1977, when the construction of the building was completed.

Transport 
Railway stations in the ward include:
Shin-Ōsaka Station (New Osaka Station), the terminus of the Tōkaidō Shinkansen which runs to Tokyo and the Sanyō Shinkansen which links to Fukuoka.

Landmarks
The Jūsō area typifies the unique culture of Osaka.

Education 

Schools in the ward include Kitano High School.

Politics

In 2013, Yodogawa-ku, Osaka became the first Japanese government area to pass a resolution officiating support for LGBT inclusion, including mandating LGBT sensitivity training for ward staff.

Notable people from Yodogawa-ku, Osaka
 Yukari Taki, Japanese actress and tarento (born in Jūsō)
 Koji Yamasaki, Japanese professional baseball infielder (Tohoku Rakuten Golden Eagles, Nippon Professional Baseball - Pacific League)
 Ryujin Kiyoshi, Japanese singer songwriter
 Kotaro Omori, Japanese football player (Júbilo Iwata, J2 League)

References

External links

Official website of Yodogawa 

Wards of Osaka